Adiantum × mairisii (/adiˌantəm bʌɪ mɛːɪsɪˌʌɪ/) (also known as Mairis maidenhair fern) is a species of fern in the family Pteridaceae.

Taxonomy 
This species is a sterile hybrid between the southern maidenhair (Adiantum capillus-veneris) and another unknown species. The species is hypothesised to be:

 Adiantum raddianum
 Adiantum aethiopicum
 Adiantum cuneatum

This species is more frost-resistant than either of its parents.

Discovery 
Thomas Moore, who collected ferns during the Victorian period named the hybrid in the second half of the 19th century. It was described in his book, titled: "Nature-Printed British Ferns".

Cultivation 
This species has gained the Royal Horticultural Society's Award of Garden Merit.

The reason why this fern species is popular is due to its winter-hardiness relative to other species in the genus. The UK hardiness rating is H5, while the USDA zone range is 8-10.

Soil 
This plant thrives in organic soils under partial shade, although it can also grow in sand or clay. The soil should be light, moist, rich and well-drained.

Foliage 
In mild climates, this hybrid is evergreen. But in colder climates, it may defoliate throughout the winter. In spring, new fronds may form, where it is recommended to be pruned.

Plants and diseases 
This species is generally not susceptible to pests and diseases.

References 

mairisii
Plant nothospecies
Ferns of Europe